The 2012 Arkansas–Pine Bluff Golden Lions football team represented the University of Arkansas at Pine Bluff in the 2012 NCAA Division I FCS football season. The Golden Lions were led by fifth year head coach Monte Coleman and played their home games at Golden Lion Stadium as a member of the West Division of the Southwestern Athletic Conference (SWAC). They finished with an overall record of ten wins and two losses (10–2, 8–1 SWAC) and as SWAC champions after they defeated Jackson State in the SWAC Championship Game.

Schedule

Media
Golden Lions football games were an exclusive presentation of KUAP 89.7 FM. They broadcast every game in the 2012 season.

References

Arkansas-Pine Bluff
Arkansas–Pine Bluff Golden Lions football seasons
Southwestern Athletic Conference football champion seasons
Black college football national champions
Arkansas-Pine Bluff Golden Lions f